David Maslanka (August 30, 1943 – August 7, 2017) was an American composer of Polish descent who wrote for a variety of genres, including works for choir, wind ensemble, chamber music, and symphony orchestra.

Best known for his wind ensemble compositions, Maslanka published over 150 pieces, including ten symphonies, eight of them for concert band, over 15 concerti, and a full Mass. His compositional style is rhythmically intense and complex, highly tonal and melodically oriented. His compositions have been performed throughout the United States, Europe, Australia, Canada, and Japan. His Tenth Symphony was orchestrated by his son, Matthew Maslanka, as it was incomplete at the composer's death.

Life
Maslanka received his Bachelor of Music from the Oberlin Conservatory (1961–1965) and went on to earn a Master of Music and Doctor of Philosophy from Michigan State University (1965–71). During his undergraduate work, Maslanka also spent one year studying abroad at the Mozarteum in Salzburg, Austria (1963–64). While attending Michigan State University, Maslanka studied composition with H. Owen Reed. He served over 20 years on the faculty at Kingsborough Community College of the City University of New York and also served on the faculty at Sarah Lawrence College, New York University. Maslanka was a freelance composer and had worked solely on commissions from 1990 on. He lived in Missoula, Montana. He had two brothers named John and Robert Maslanka, who both are living in other parts of the U.S. He married Alison Matthews in 1981, who died on July 3, 2017, and is survived by three children: Steven, Matthew, and Kathryn.

Maslanka died on August 7, 2017, following a brief battle with colon cancer. His Tenth Symphony (for concert band) was completed by his son Matthew, and received its premiere on 3 April 2018, by the University of Utah Wind Ensemble, Salt Lake City.

Awards and honors

Maslanka received five residency fellowships at the MacDowell Colony in Peterborough, New Hampshire (1974, 1975, 1978, 1979, and 1982), as well as generous grants from the University of Connecticut Research Foundation, the American Music Center, the Martha Baird Rockefeller Fund for Music, the State University of New York Research Foundation, and the American Society of Composers, Authors, and Publishers (ASCAP). He earned the National Endowment for the Arts Composer Award three times (1974, 1975, and 1989). In 1999, he was awarded the National Symphony Orchestra regional composer-in-residence award. In 2008, he was initiated as an honorary member of the men's music fraternity, Phi Mu Alpha Sinfonia, by the Rho Tau Chapter at Appalachian State University during the annual Contemporary Music Festival. From 1980 until his death in 2017, Maslanka served as a guest composer for over 100 universities, music festivals, and conferences.

Works

Many of Maslanka's compositions for winds and percussion have become established pieces in band repertoire. Among these pieces are A Child's Garden of Dreams, Rollo Takes a Walk, Hymn for World Peace, numerous concertos featuring a wide variety of solo instruments, including euphonium, flute, piano, marimba, alto saxophone, and (most recently) trombone. Maslanka's second and fourth symphonies have become particularly popular wind literature. His works for percussion include Montana Music: Three Dances for Percussion, Variations of 'Lost Love''', My Lady White, Arcadia II: Concerto for Marimba and Percussion Ensemble, and Crown of Thorns. Maslanka also wrote a complete Mass for full choir, soprano, and baritone solo, with accompaniment by full symphonic band. Having spent his childhood in the New England area, several of Maslanka's compositions were influenced by his close relationship with the ocean. Sea Dreams, for example, as well as the second movement of his second symphony, reference large bodies of water. Maslanka's works have been recorded and produced primarily by Albany Records, as well as Cambria Records, Crest, CRI, Klavier Music Productions, Mark, Novisse, St. Olaf, and Umass labels.

Most of his music was published by Carl Fischer. Maslanka acknowledged the influence of his Polish heritage on his compositions.

References

Further reading
 Delta Omicron International Music Fraternity. 2011. "Welcome To Delta Omicron International Music Fraternity". Delta Omicron website, edited & maintained by Whitney Mullins. (Accessed 26 March 2012).
 Hippensteel, Scott A. 2011. A Study of David Maslanka’s “Unending Stream of Life”.
 Phillips, Paul.  2001. "Maslanka, David". New Grove Dictionary of Music and Musicians'', second edition, edited by Stanley Sadie and John Tyrrell, 16:30. London: Macmillan Publishers.

External links
David Maslanka's website
Maslanka Press
David Maslanka's page at Carl Fischer

1943 births
2017 deaths
American male classical composers
American classical composers
20th-century classical composers
21st-century classical composers
Concert band composers
Musicians from Missoula, Montana
Sarah Lawrence College faculty
People from New Bedford, Massachusetts
Oberlin Conservatory of Music alumni
Michigan State University alumni
City University of New York faculty
New York University faculty
21st-century American composers
Deaths from colorectal cancer
20th-century American composers
Classical musicians from Massachusetts
20th-century American male musicians
21st-century American male musicians
American people of Polish descent